Ceccherini is an Italian surname. Notable people with the surname include:

Federico Ceccherini (born 1992), Italian footballer
Giuseppe Ceccherini (1829–1899), Italian composer
Massimo Ceccherini (born 1965), Italian actor, film director and comedian
Sante Ceccherini (1863–1932), Italian fencer
Silvano Ceccherini (1915–1974), Italian anarchist and writer

Italian-language surnames